The Grand Pacific Hotel was one of the first two prominent hotels built in Chicago, Illinois, after the Great Chicago Fire. The hotel, designed by William W. Boyington and managed for more than 20 years by John Drake, was located on the block bounded by Clark Street, LaSalle, Quincy and Jackson. It was a replacement for the Paficic Hotel, which had been built in 1871 (also designed by Boyington), only to burn in the fire later that year.

Drake hosted "Great Game Dinners" featuring exotic cuisines at this hotel.  These dinners were a Chicago social institution for more than 50 years.  Newspapers devoted 4 inches to its menu and guests.

Along with contemporary Chicago luxury hotels such as the Palmer House, Tremont House, and Sherman House, it was built in the palazzo architectural style of the day. The hotel also accommodated wealthy permanent residents in addition to transient guests who enjoyed the palace hotel. 

Many notable celebrities stayed here, including Oscar Wilde on his first visit to Chicago as part of his 1882 lecture tour of America.  James A. Garfield stayed at the hotel during the 1880 Republican National Convention, during which time he was nominated on the 34th ballot to represent the party in the election for President of the United States. The hotel was the site where Standard time was adopted on October 11, 1883.

The western half of the 1873 structure was demolished in 1895 in order to make way for the Illinois Trust and Savings Bank building. The remaining eastern half was remodeled by the architectural firm Jenney and Mundie. It reopened March 12, 1898, with 188 rooms, and remained open until 1921. In 1921, it was demolished to make way for the Continental Illinois Bank building.

Notes

Hotel buildings completed in 1873
1873 establishments in Illinois
1895 disestablishments in Illinois
Demolished hotels in Chicago
Hotels established in 1873
Hotels disestablished in 1895